Irun Cohen (born September 1 1937, Chicago, Illinois) is an immunologist at the Weizmann Institute of Science, Israel. He moved from the U.S. to Israel in 1968.

His contributions to immunology includes, in 1989, the development of the theory of the immunological homunculus, a hypothetical self-image used by the immune system to govern its responses. The bulk of Professor Cohen's work is in the search for treatment for autoimmune disease. Throughout his career he has collaborated with scientists of all nationalities, including the Cuban immunologist Enrique Montero. Cohen is currently the Israeli scientist with the second (first is Leo Sachs) largest number of publications in the journals of Science and Nature.

Early life and education
Cohen studied philosophy at Northwestern University obtaining a Bachelor of Arts in 1959. He studied medicine at Northwestern Medical School obtaining a degree in medicine in 1963.

References

External links
 

1937 births
Living people
American immunologists
Academic staff of Weizmann Institute of Science
Israeli immunologists